Henry Oliver Ochieng (born 11 November 1998) is a professional footballer who plays as a midfielder for Aldershot Town. Born in England, he represents the Kenyan national team.

Club career
Ochieng was raised in Ilford and attended St Aubyn's School in Woodford Green and later Forest School in Walthamstow. He started his career with local junior side Buckhurst Hill before being spotted and signed by the youth team at West Ham United in 2009. He signed a two-year scholarship with Leyton Orient in 2015.

Ochieng made his first-team debut on 8 November 2016 as an 81st-minute substitute for Žan Benedičič in Orient's 1–0 away defeat to Brighton & Hove Albion U23 in the EFL Trophy. He signed his first professional contract in December. He made his League Two debut on 25 March 2017 as an 81st-minute substitute for Nigel Atangana in Orient's 3–0 defeat away to Crawley Town. Ochieng was released by Leyton Orient in March 2018.

Ahead of the 2018–19 season, Ochieng signed for newly promoted National League club Braintree Town. Ochieng made five appearances for the Iron before joining Welwyn Garden City on 28 March 2019. He joined Wingate & Finchley for the 2019–20 season. On 30 January 2020, it was announced by Wingate & Finchley that Ochieng had been sold for an undisclosed fee to League of Ireland Premier Division side Cork City, returning to professional football following 31 appearances for the club. The following day, Cork City officially announced the signing of Ochieng.

In January 2021, Ochieng joined Championship side Watford, signing a contract with the under-23s until the end of the 2020–21 season. Ochieng joined Billericay Town in December 2021. On 15 July 2022, Ochieng joined rivals Chelmsford City. 
On 13 February 2023, he joined Aldershot Town on an eighteen-month contract.

International career
Ochieng, whose parents were born in Kenya, was called up by the Kenya national team for their 2019 Africa Cup of Nations qualifier against Sierra Leone in November 2018, but the match was later cancelled. He instead made his debut for the Kenya U23 against Mauritius on 14 November 2018 in 2019 Africa U-23 Cup of Nations qualification.

Career statistics

References

External links

1998 births
Living people
Footballers from Ilford
People educated at Forest School, Walthamstow
English footballers
People with acquired Kenyan citizenship
Kenyan footballers
Association football midfielders
Leyton Orient F.C. players
Braintree Town F.C. players
Welwyn Garden City F.C. players
Wingate & Finchley F.C. players
Cork City F.C. players
Watford F.C. players
Hemel Hempstead Town F.C. players
Billericay Town F.C. players
Chelmsford City F.C. players
Aldershot Town F.C. players
English Football League players
National League (English football) players
Southern Football League players
Isthmian League players
English people of Kenyan descent
English sportspeople of African descent
League of Ireland players
Expatriate association footballers in the Republic of Ireland
Black British sportsmen